Paul Frederick Bennett (born March 27, 1954) is a former award-winning and all-star defensive back in the Canadian Football League and Grey Cup champion.

He attended General Brock Public School and W. A. Porter Collegiate Institute in Scarborough, Ontario. As a high school football player Paul played defensive back and quarterback and was named a Toronto All Star in 1972.

Offered a full football scholarship to the University of Missouri, in Columbia, Missouri, he played on the Tigers freshman team in 1973. He was redshirted on the varsity squad for his sophomore year.

In 1974 Bennett returned to Canada and attended Wilfrid Laurier University in Waterloo, Ontario. He played for WLU in 1975 and 1976, coached by Canadian Football Hall of Famer Tuffy Knight. He was protected by the Toronto Argonauts in the CFL draft.

Bennett was a hard-hitting safety and a fierce punt returner. He is a member of the Canadian Football Hall of Fame and won a Grey Cup with Hamilton in 1986 (whom he played with from 1985 to 1987,) after stints at the Winnipeg Blue Bombers (1980–1983), and Toronto Argonauts (1977–1979 and 1984).

Bennett retired in 1987 after eleven seasons. He had 45 interceptions and CFL records in punt return yards (6,358), punt return carries (659) and interception return yards (1,004).

He won the CFL's Most Outstanding Canadian Award in 1983 and 1985 and the James P. McCaffrey Trophy in 1985. He was a 4-time all star. In 1985, he was an all-star and won the James P. McCaffrey Trophy as Outstanding Defensive Player in the Eastern Division. And, for the second time in his career, he won the CFL's Most Outstanding Canadian Award.

He lives in Winnipeg, and brought the 2009 Canadian Football Hall of Fame Induction ceremony to the city.  He is currently Head Coach for the Oak Park High School Raiders Junior Varsity football team.

Awards and honours 
Grey Cup Champion - 1986
CFL All-Star - 1977, 1983, 1985
Eastern All-Star - 1977, 1985
Western All-Star - 1982, 1983
Schenley Most Outstanding Canadian Player - 1983, 1985
James P. McCaffrey Trophy: Outstanding Defensive Player Eastern Division - 1985
Lew Hayman Trophy: Outstanding Canadian Eastern Division - 1985
Dr. Beattie Martin Trophy: Outstanding Canadian Player Western Division - 1983
Grey Cup Participation - 1984, 1985, 1986

References

External links 
Toronto Argonauts profile

1954 births
Living people
Canadian expatriate sportspeople in the United States
Canadian football defensive backs
Canadian Football Hall of Fame inductees
Canadian Football League Most Outstanding Canadian Award winners
Canadian football return specialists
Canadian people of British descent
Hamilton Tiger-Cats players
Players of Canadian football from Ontario
Canadian football people from Toronto
Toronto Argonauts players
University of Missouri alumni
Wilfrid Laurier Golden Hawks football players
Winnipeg Blue Bombers players